The Ethereal Stakes is a Melbourne Racing Club Group 3 Thoroughbred horse race for three year old fillies, at Set Weights with penalties, over a distance of 2,000 metres at Caulfield Racecourse, Melbourne, Australia in October. Total prize money for the race is A$200,000.

History
The race is named after the champion mare Ethereal, who won the 2001 Caulfield Cup–Melbourne Cup double.

Name
 2000–2001 - Foster's Light Ice Handicap
 2002 - Carlton Draught Handicap
 2003–2006 - Skyy Blue Plate 
 2007 - Fat Quaddies Cup
 2008 - Perri Cutten Plate
 2009 - Sportingbet Plate
 2010 - Sportingbet Stakes
 2011 onwards  - Ethereal Stakes

Grade
 prior 2011 - Handicap
 2011–2014 - Listed Race
 2015 onwards - Group 3 race

Winners

 2022 - Renaissance Woman
 2021 - Daisies
 2020 - Chica Fuerte
 2019 - Gamay
 2018 - Verry Elleegant
 2017 - Pinot
 2016 - Eleonora
 2015 - Dawnie Perfect
 2014 - Set Square
 2013 - Arabian Gold
 2012 - Alzora 
 2011 - Gliding 
 2010 - Dizlago 
 2009 - Run For Naara 
 2008 - Estee 
 2007 - Try This 
 2006 - Amitola 
 2005 - Astronomia 
 2004 - Mango Daiquiri 
 2003 - Timbourina 
 2002 - Hierogram 
 2001 - Gold Lottey 
 2000 - Lolita Star

See also
 List of Australian Group races
 Group races

References

Horse races in Australia
Caulfield Racecourse